Davit Chichveishvili (born 23 January 1975) is a former Georgian professional football player. He has won three Umaglesi League and four Cups.

External links
Profile at Footballfacts.ru

1975 births
Living people
Footballers from Georgia (country)
Expatriate footballers from Georgia (country)
FC Dinamo Tbilisi players
FC Spartak Vladikavkaz players
FK Standard Sumgayit players
FC Dinamo Batumi players
Russian Premier League players
Erovnuli Liga players
Georgia (country) international footballers
Expatriate footballers in Russia
Expatriate footballers in Kazakhstan
Expatriate footballers in Azerbaijan
Expatriate sportspeople from Georgia (country) in Russia
Expatriate sportspeople from Georgia (country) in Azerbaijan
Expatriate sportspeople from Georgia (country) in Kazakhstan
Association football forwards
Association football defenders